The 1972 Summer Olympics, officially known as the Games of the XX Olympiad and commonly known as Munich 1972, was an international multi-sport event held in Munich, West Germany, from 26 August to 11 September 1972.

The event was overshadowed by the Munich massacre in the second week, in which eleven Israeli athletes and coaches and a West German police officer at Olympic village were killed by Palestinian Black September members. The motivation for the attack was the ongoing Palestinian-Israeli conflict.

The 1972 Summer Olympics were the second Summer Olympics to be held in Germany, after the 1936 Games in Berlin, which had taken place under the Nazi regime, and the most recent Olympics to be held in the country. The West German Government had been eager to have the Munich Olympics present a democratic and optimistic Germany to the world, as shown by the Games' official motto, "Die Heiteren Spiele", or "the cheerful Games". The logo of the Games was a blue solar logo (the "Bright Sun") by Otl Aicher, the designer and director of the visual conception commission. The hostesses wore sky-blue dirndls as a promotion of Bavarian cultural heritage. The Olympic mascot, the dachshund "Waldi", was the first officially named Olympic mascot. The Olympic Fanfare was composed by Herbert Rehbein. The Soviet Union won the most gold and overall medals.

The Olympic Park (Olympiapark) is based on Frei Otto's plans and after the Games became a Munich landmark. The competition sites, designed by architect Günther Behnisch, included the Olympic swimming hall, the Olympics Hall (Olympiahalle, a multipurpose facility) and the Olympic Stadium (Olympiastadion), and an Olympic village very close to the park. The design of the stadium was considered revolutionary, with sweeping canopies of acrylic glass stabilized by metal ropes, used on such a large scale for the first time.

Host city selection 

Munich won its Olympic bid on 26 April 1966, at the 64th IOC Session in Rome, Italy, over bids presented by Detroit, Madrid, and Montréal. Montréal would eventually host the following Olympic games in 1976.

Munich massacre 

The Games were largely overshadowed by what has come to be known as the "Munich massacre". Just before dawn on 5 September, a group of eight members of the Palestinian Black September terrorist organization broke into the Olympic Village and took eleven Israeli athletes, coaches and officials hostage in their apartments. Two of the hostages who resisted were killed in the first moments of the break-in; the subsequent standoff in the Olympic Village lasted for almost 18 hours.

Late in the evening of 5 September that same day, the terrorists and their nine remaining hostages were transferred by helicopter to the military airport of Fürstenfeldbruck, ostensibly to board a plane bound for an undetermined Arab country. The German authorities planned to ambush them there, but underestimated the numbers of their opposition and were thus undermanned. During a botched rescue attempt, all of the Israeli hostages were killed. Four of them were shot, then incinerated when one of the terrorists detonated a grenade inside the helicopter in which the hostages were sitting. The 5 remaining hostages were then shot and killed with a machine gun.

All but three of the terrorists were killed as well. Although arrested and imprisoned pending trial, they were released by the West German government on 29 October 1972, in exchange for the hijacked Lufthansa Flight 615. Two of those three were supposedly hunted down and assassinated later by the Mossad. Jamal Al-Gashey, who is believed to be the sole survivor, is still living today in hiding in an unspecified African country with his wife and two children. The Olympic events were suspended several hours after the initial attack for the first time in the modern Olympic Games history, but once the incident was concluded, Avery Brundage, the International Olympic Committee president, declared that "the Games must go on". A memorial ceremony was then held in the Olympic stadium, and the competitions resumed after a stoppage of 34 hours. Due to the suspension, the Games were originally to close on 10 September and had been rescheduled to 11 September. The attack prompted heightened security at subsequent Olympics beginning with the 1976 Winter Olympics. Security at Olympics was heightened further beginning with the 2002 Winter Olympics, as they were the first to take place after the 2001 September 11 attacks.

The massacre led the German federal government to re-examine its anti-terrorism policies, which at the time were dominated by a pacifist approach adopted after World War II. This led to the creation of the elite counter-terrorist unit GSG 9, similar to the British SAS. It also led Israel to launch a campaign known as Operation Wrath of God, in which those suspected of involvement were systematically tracked down and assassinated.

The events of the Munich massacre were chronicled in the Oscar-winning documentary, One Day in September. An account of the aftermath is also dramatized in three films: the 1976 made-for-TV movie 21 Hours at Munich, the 1986 made-for-TV movie Sword of Gideon and Steven Spielberg's 2005 film Munich. In her film 1972, Artist Sarah Morris interviews Dr. Georg Sieber, a former police psychiatrist who advised the Olympics' security team, about the events and aftermath of Black September.

Highlights 

 These were the final Olympic Games under the IOC presidency of Avery Brundage.
 Mark Spitz set a world record when he won seven gold medals (while on the way to setting a new world record for each of his seven gold medals) in a single Olympics, bringing his lifetime total to nine (he had won two golds in Mexico City's Games four years earlier). Being Jewish, Spitz was asked to leave Munich before the closing ceremonies for his own protection, after fears arose that he would be an additional target of those responsible for the Munich massacre. Spitz's record stood until 2008, when it was beaten by Michael Phelps who won eight gold medals in the pool.
 Olga Korbut, a Soviet gymnast, became a media star after winning a gold medal in the team competition event, failing to win in the individual all-around after a fall (she was beaten by teammate Lyudmilla Turischeva), and finally winning two gold medals in the Balance Beam and the floor exercise events.
 In the final of the men's basketball, the United States lost to the Soviet Union in what is widely considered as the most controversial game in international basketball history. In a close-fought match, the U.S. team appeared to have won by a score of 50–49. However, the final 3 seconds of the game were replayed three times by judges until the Soviet team came out on top and claimed a 51–50 victory. Ultimately the U.S team refused to accept their silver medals, which remain held in a vault in Lausanne, Switzerland.
 Lasse Virén of Finland won the 5,000 and 10,000 m (the latter after a fall), a feat he repeated in the 1976 Summer Olympics.
 Valeriy Borzov of the Soviet Union won both the 100 m and 200 m in track and field. 
 The 100 metres event was notable for the absence of favorites and world record holders Eddie Hart and Rey Robinson for their quarterfinal heats.  American sprint coach Stan Wright, had been given the wrong starting time. All three qualified American athletes were at the ABC television headquarters watching what they thought were replays of their morning preliminary races.  In fact, they were watching live coverage of the races they should have been in.  Hart and Robinson, scheduled in the first two races, missed their heats.  The athletes rushed to the stadium, with Robert Taylor hurrying to take off his warm up uniform before running the later heat.
 Two American 400 m runners, Vincent Matthews (gold medalist) and Wayne Collett (silver medalist), staged a protest on the victory podium, talking to each other and failing to stand at attention during the medal ceremony. They were banned by the IOC, as Tommie Smith and John Carlos had been in the 1968 Summer Olympics. Since John Smith had pulled a hamstring in the final and had been ruled unfit to run, the United States were forced to scratch from the 4×400 m relay.
 Dave Wottle won the men's 800 m, after being last for the first 600 m, at which point he started to pass runner after runner up the final straightaway, finally grabbing the lead in the final 18 metres to win by 0.03 seconds ahead of the favorite, the Soviet Yevgeny Arzhanov. At the victory ceremony, Wottle forgot to remove his golf cap. This was interpreted by some as a form of protest against the Vietnam War, but Wottle later apologized.
 Australian swimmer Shane Gould won three gold medals, a silver, and a bronze medal at the age of 15.
 Hurdler Abdalá Bucaram carried the Ecuadorian flag at the opening ceremony. 24 years later he became the President of Ecuador. In Munich, he had to pull out of his event due to injury.
 Handball (last held in 1936) and Archery (last held in 1920) returned as Olympic sports after a long absence.
 Slalom canoeing was held for the first time at the Olympics.
 Dan Gable won the gold medal in wrestling without having a single point scored against him. No other athlete has ever accomplished such a feat in Olympic wrestling.
 Wim Ruska became the first judoka to win two gold medals.
 For the first time, the Olympic Oath was taken by a representative of the referees.
 American Frank Shorter, who was born in Munich, became the first from his country in 64 years to win the Olympic marathon. As Shorter was nearing the stadium, German student Norbert Sudhaus entered the stadium wearing a track uniform, joined the race and ran the last kilometre; thinking he was the winner, the crowd began cheering him before officials realized the hoax and security escorted Sudhaus off the track. Arriving seconds later, Shorter was understandably perplexed to see someone ahead of him and to hear the boos and catcalls meant for Sudhaus. This was the third time in Olympic history that an American had won the marathon (after Thomas Hicks 1904 and Johnny Hayes 1908) — and in none of those three instances did the winner enter the stadium first.

 Rick DeMont of the United States originally won the gold medal in the men's 400 metre freestyle swimming. Following the race, the International Olympic Committee (IOC) stripped DeMont of his gold medal after his post-race urinalysis tested positive for traces of the banned substance ephedrine contained in his prescription asthma medication, Marax. The positive test following the 400-meter freestyle final also deprived him of a chance at multiple medals, as he was not permitted to swim in any other events at the 1972 Olympics, including the 1,500-meter freestyle for which he was the then-current world record-holder. Before the Olympics, DeMont had properly declared his asthma medications on his medical disclosure forms, but the U.S. Olympic Committee (USOC) had not cleared them with the IOC's medical committee. The United States Olympic Committee (USOC) has recognized his gold medal performance in the 1972 Summer Olympics in 2001, but only the IOC has the power to restore his medal, and it has refused to do so as of 2020.
 The men's pole vault field event at the games took place on 1 & 2 September.  Controversy arose when the new Cata-Pole, used by defending champion American Bob Seagren and Sweden's Kjell Isaksson, was declared to be illegal, by the IAAF, on 25 July. The pole was banned based on the fact that the pole contained carbon fibers; after an East German-led protest revealed that it contained no carbon fibers, the ban was lifted on 27 August.  Three days later the IAAF reversed itself again, reinstating the ban. The poles were then confiscated from the athletes. Seagren and Isaksson believed this gave other athletes, like the eventual gold medalist, Wolfgang Nordwig, an unfair advantage.  Seagren and Isaksson were given substitute poles which they had never used before to jump with.  Isaksson, who had lost the world record to Seagren only two months earlier, didn't clear a height in the qualifying round and was eliminated. After Seagren's last vault he was so incensed by the way IAAF officials handled the event, he took the pole he had been forced to vault with and handed it back to IAAF President Adriaan Paulen. This was the first Olympics where the pole vault had not been won by an American.  Prior to 1972, the United States  had won 16 straight. Since 1972, the United States has only won the men's pole vault twice, equalling the record of Poland and components of the Soviet Union. France has won three times since 1984.
 Badminton and water skiing were demonstration sports.

Venues 

 Munich Olympic Park (Olympiapark)
 Olympic Stadium (Olympiastadion) – opening/closing ceremonies, athletics, equestrian (jumping team), football (final), modern pentathlon (running), memorial service for Israeli athletes
 Boxing Hall (Boxhalle) – boxing, judo (final)
 Cycling Stadium (Radstadion) – cycling (track)
 Olympic Sports Hall (Sporthalle) – gymnastics, handball (final)
 Hockey Facility (Hockeyanlage) – field hockey
 Swimming Hall (Schwimmhalle) – swimming, diving, water polo (final), modern pentathlon (swimming)
 Volleyball Hall (Volleyballhalle) – volleyball
 Olympic Village (Olympisches Dorf)
 Venues in Greater Munich
 Regatta Course (Regattastrecke), Oberschleißheim – canoe sprint, rowing
 Basketball Hall (Basketballhalle), Siegenburger Straße – basketball, judo
 Fairgrounds, Fencing Hall 1 (Messegelände, Fechthalle 1) – fencing (final)
 Fairgrounds, Fencing Hall 2 (Messe München#1972 Summer Olympics, Fechthalle 2) – fencing, modern pentathlon (fencing)
 Fairgrounds, Weightlifting Hall (Messe München#1972 Summer Olympics, Gewichtheberhalle) – weightlifting
 Fairgrounds, Judo and Wrestling Hall (Messe München#1972 Summer Olympics, Judo- und Ringerhalle) – judo, wrestling
 Dante Swimming Pool (Dantebad) – water polo
 Shooting Facility (Schießanlage), Hochbrück – shooting, modern pentathlon (shooting)
 Archery Facility (Bogenschießanlage), Englischer Garten – archery
 Riding Facility, Riem – equestrian (jumping individual, eventing cross-country), modern pentathlon (riding)
 Dressage Facility Nymphenburg – equestrian (dressage)
 Grünwald – cycling (individual road race)
 Other venues
 Olympic Yachting Center, Kiel-Schilksee – water skiing, sailing
 Urban Stadium (Nuremberg) – football/soccer preliminaries
 Jahnstadion (Regensburg) – football/soccer preliminaries
 Dreiflüssestadion (Passau) – football/soccer preliminaries
 ESV-Stadion (Ingolstadt) – football/soccer preliminaries
 Augsburg – canoe slalom (Eiskanal), football/soccer preliminaries (Rosenaustadion), handball preliminaries (Sporthalle Augsburg)
 Donauhalle Ulm – handball preliminaries
 Hohenstaufenhalle Göppingen (Göppingen) – handball preliminaries
 Böblingen Sportshalle – handball preliminaries
 Bundesautobahn 96 – cycling (road team time trial)

Cost
The Oxford Olympics Study established the outturn cost of the Munich 1972 Summer Olympics at US$1.0 billion in 2015-dollars. This includes sports-related costs only, that is, (i) operational costs incurred by the organizing committee for the purpose of staging the Games, e.g., expenditures for technology, transportation, workforce, administration, security, catering, ceremonies, and medical services, and (ii) direct capital costs incurred by the host city and country or private investors to build, e.g., the competition venues, the Olympic village, international broadcast center, and media and press center, which are required to host the Games. Indirect capital costs are not included, such as for road, rail, or airport infrastructure, or for hotel upgrades or other business investment incurred in preparation for the Games but not directly related to staging the Games. The cost for Munich 1972 compares with costs of US$4.6 billion for Rio 2016, US$15 billion for London 2012 (the most costly Summer Olympics to date) and US$51 billion for Sochi 2014 — the most expensive Olympic Games in history. Average cost for Summer Games since 1960 is US$5.2 billion.

Sports 
The 1972 Summer Olympic programme featured 195 events in the following 21 sports:

 Aquatics
 
 
 
 
 
 
 
 
 Flatwater (7)
 Slalom (4)
 
 Road (2)
 Track (5)
 
 Dressage (2)
 Eventing (2)
 Show jumping (2)
 
 
 
 
 
 
 
 
 
 
 
 
 
 Freestyle (10)
 Greco-Roman (10)

Demonstration sports 
 Badminton
 Water skiing

Participating National Olympic Committees 

Eleven nations made their first Olympic appearance in Munich: Albania, Dahomey (now Benin), Gabon, North Korea, Lesotho, Malawi, Saudi Arabia, Somalia, Swaziland, Togo, Upper Volta (now Burkina Faso).

Rhodesia's invitation to take part in the 1972 Summer Games was withdrawn by the International Olympic Committee four days before the opening ceremony, in response to African countries' (such as Ethiopia and Kenya) protests against the Rhodesian government. (Rhodesia did, however, compete in the 1972 Summer Paralympics, held a little earlier in Heidelberg.) The People's Republic of China last competed at the 1952 Summer Games but had since withdrawn from the IOC due to a dispute with the Republic of China over the right to represent China.

Calendar 
All times are in Central European Time (UTC+1)

Medal count 

These are the top ten nations that won medals at the 1972 Games.

Key
 Host nation (West Germany)

Doping
The report, titled "Doping in Germany from 1950 to today", details how the West German government helped fund a wide-scale doping program. Doping of West German athletes was prevalent at the Munich Games of 1972.

See also 

 1972 Summer Olympics – Munich, Bavaria, West Germany — Munich massacre
 1972 Summer Olympics medal table
 The Rt. Hon. The 3rd Baron Killanin

Notes

External links 

 
 The main theme of the 1972 Summer Olympics by Gunther Noris and the Big Band of Bundeswehr "Munich Fanfare March-Swinging Olympia

Further reading
 Schiller, Kay, and Christopher Young. The 1972 Munich Olympics and the Making of Modern Germany (University of California Press; 2010) 348 pages
 Preuss, Holger. The Economics of Staging the Olympics: A Comparison of the Games, 1972–2008 (2006)
 Oxlade, Chris, et al. Olympics. Rev. ed. London: DK, 2005. Print.

 
Olympics Games
1972 in West German sport
1970s in Munich
O
Multi-sport events in West Germany
Olympic Games in Germany
Summer Olympics by year
Olympics Games
Olympics Games
Sports competitions in Munich